Anisopodus acutus is a species of longhorn beetles of the subfamily Lamiinae that was described by Thomson in 1865, and is from Brazil.

References

Anisopodus
Beetles described in 1865
Endemic fauna of Brazil
Fauna of South America
Insects of South America